Jayaprakash Narayan (11 October 1902 – 8 October 1979), popularly referred to as JP or Lok Nayak (Hindi for "People's leader"), was an Indian independence activist, theorist, socialist and political leader.  He is remembered for leading the mid-1970s opposition against Prime Minister Indira Gandhi, for whose overthrow he had called for a "total revolution". His biography, Jayaprakash, was written by his nationalist friend and the writer of Hindi literature, Rambriksh Benipuri. In 1999, he was posthumously awarded the Bharat Ratna, India's highest civilian award, in recognition of his social service. Other awards include the Magsaysay award for Public Service in 1965.

Early life
Jayprakash Narayan was born on 11 October 1902 in the village of Sitabdiara, Ballia district, United Provinces, British India (present-day Saran district, Bihar, India). Sitabdiara is a large village, straddling two states and three districts — Saran and Bhojpur in Bihar and Ballia in Uttar Pradesh. His house was near the banks of the flood-prone Ghaghara river. Every time the river swelled, the house would get a little bit damaged, eventually forcing the family to move a few kilometres away to a settlement which is now known as Jay Prakash Nagar and falls in Uttar Pradesh.

He came from a Srivastava Kayastha family. He was the fourth child of Harsu Dayal and Phul Rani Devi. His father Harsu Dayal was a junior official in the Canal Department of the State government and was often touring the region. When Narayan was 9 years old, he left his village to enroll in the seventh class of the collegiate school at Patna. This was his first break from village life. JP stayed at a student hostel—Saraswati Bhawan—in which most of the boys were a bit older. Among them were some of Bihar's future leaders including its first chief minister, Krishna Singh, his deputy Anugrah Narayan Sinha and several others who were to widely become known in politics and academic world.

In October 1918, Narayan married Braj Kishore Prasad's elder daughter Prabhavati Devi, a freedom fighter in her own right. After their wedding, since Narayan was working in Patna and it was difficult for his wife to stay with him, on the invitation of Gandhi, Prabhavati became an inmate at Sabarmati Ashram (Ahmedabad). Jayaprakash, along with some friends, went to listen to Maulana Abul Kalam Azad speak about the Non-co-operation movement launched by Gandhi against the passing of the Rowlatt Act of 1919. The Maulana was a brilliant orator and his call to give up English education was "like leaves before a storm: Jayaprakash was swept away and momentarily lifted up to the skies. That brief experience of soaring up with the winds of a great idea left imprints on his inner being". Jayaprakash took the Maulana's words to heart and left Bihar National College with just 20 days remaining for his examinations. Jayaprakash joined the Bihar Vidyapeeth, a college founded by Rajendra Prasad and became among the first students of Gandhian Anugraha Narayan Sinha.

Higher education in the United States 
After exhausting the courses at the Vidyapeeth, Jayaprakash decided to continue studies in the United States.
At age 20, Jayaprakash sailed aboard the cargo ship Janus while Prabhavati remained at Sabarmati. Jayaprakash reached California on 8 October 1922 and was admitted to Berkeley in January 1923. To pay for his education, Jayaprakash picked grapes, set them out to dry, packed fruits at a canning factory, washed dishes, worked as a mechanic at a garage and at a slaughterhouse, sold lotions and taught. All these jobs gave Jayaprakash an insight into the difficulties of the working class.

After a semester studying chemistry at UC Berkeley, Jayaprakash was forced to transfer to The University of Iowa when fees at Berkeley were doubled. He was forced to transfer to many universities thereafter. He pursued his favourite subject, sociology, and received much help from Professor Edward Ross.

In Wisconsin, Jayaprakash was introduced to Karl Marx's Das Kapital. News of the success of the Bolsheviks in Russian Civil War made Jayaprakash conclude that Marxism was the way to alleviate the suffering of the masses. He delved into books by Indian intellectual and Communist theoretician M. N. Roy. His paper on sociology, Cultural Variation, was declared the best of the year. He obtained M.A., Sociology from University of Wisconsin, and B. A., in Behavioral Science from Ohio State University.

Politics

Narayan returned from the US to India in late 1929 as a Marxist. He joined the Indian National Congress on the invitation of Jawaharlal Nehru in 1929; Mahatma Gandhi became his mentor in the Congress. He shared a house at Kadam Kuan in Patna with his close friend and nationalist Ganga Sharan Singh (Sinha) with whom he shared the most cordial and lasting friendship. 

After being jailed in 1930 for civil disobedience against British rule, Narayan was imprisoned in Nasik Jail, where he met Ram Manohar Lohia, Minoo Masani, Achyut Patwardhan, Ashok Mehta, Basawon Singh, Yusuf Desai, C K Narayanaswami and other national leaders. After his release, the Congress Socialist Party, or (CSP), a left-wing group within the Congress, was formed with Acharya Narendra Deva as president and Narayan as General secretary.

When Mahatma Gandhi launched the Quit India Movement in August 1942, Yogendra Shukla scaled the wall of Hazaribagh Central Jail along with Jayaprakash Narayan, Suraj Narayan Singh, Gulab Chand Gupta, Pandit Ramnandan Mishra, Shaligram Singh and Shyam Barthwar, with a goal to start an underground movement for freedom. Many young socialist leaders like Ram Manohar Lohia, Chhotubhai Puranik, Aruna Asaf Ali, etc. took part in underground movement. As Jayaprakash Narayan was ill, Yogendra Shukla walked to Gaya with Jayaprakash Narayan on his shoulders, a distance of about 124 kilometres. He also served as the Chairman of Anugrah Smarak Nidhi (Anugrah Narayan Memorial Fund).

After Freedom 
Between 1947 and 1953, Jayaprakash Narayan was President of All India Railwaymen's Federation, the largest labour union in the Indian Railways.

Bihar Movement and Total Revolution

Narayan returned to prominence in State politics in the late 1960s. 1974 ushered in a year of high inflation, unemployment and lack of supplies and essential commodities. Nav Nirman Andolan movement of Gujarat asked Jayaprakash to lead a peaceful agitation. Following Jayaprakash Narayan's call for social justice, and a demand for dissolution of the Bihar assembly.

The Bihar government used brutal force to suppress the movement and on 18 March 1974, police fired on unarmed demonstrators and eight people were killed in police firing. On 8 April 1974, aged 72, he led a silent procession at Patna. As, Jayaprakash Narayan crossed the barricaded area followed by Satyendra Narain Sinha, Shyam Nandan Mishra, Digvijay Narayan Singh & B.R. Chandwar, the procession was lathi charged. On 5 June 1974, Jayaprakash addressed a large crowd at Gandhi Maidan in Patna. He declared, "This is a revolution, friends! We are not here merely to see the Vidhan Sabha dissolved. That is only one milestone on our journey. But we have a long way to go... After 27 years of freedom, people of this country are wracked by hunger, rising prices, corruption... oppressed by every kind of injustice... it is a Total Revolution we want, nothing less!" In 1974, he led the students' movement in the state of Bihar which gradually developed into a popular people's movement known as the Bihar Movement. It was during this movement that JP gave a call for peaceful Total Revolution.  Together with V. M. Tarkunde, he founded the Citizens for Democracy in 1974 and the People's Union for Civil Liberties in 1976, both NGOs, to uphold and defend civil liberties.

Emergency
Indira Gandhi was found guilty of violating electoral laws by the Allahabad High Court. Narayan called for Indira and the CMs to resign and the military and police to disregard unconstitutional and immoral orders. He advocated a program of social transformation which he termed Sampoorna kraanti, "total revolution". Immediately afterwards, Gandhi proclaimed a national Emergency on the midnight of 25 June 1975. Desai, opposition leaders, and dissenting members of her own party were arrested that day.

Jayaprakash Narayan attracted a gathering of 100,000 people at the Ramlila grounds and thunderously recited Rashtrakavi Ramdhari Singh 'Dinkar''s wonderfully evocative poetry: Singhasan Khaali Karo Ke Janata Aaati Hai.

Narayan was kept as detenu at Chandigarh even after he asked for one month parole to mobilise relief in flooded parts of Bihar. His health suddenly deteriorated on 24 October, and he was released on 12 November; diagnosis at Jaslok Hospital, Bombay, revealed kidney failure; he would be on dialysis for the rest of his life.

In the UK, Surur Hoda launched the "Free JP" campaign chaired by Nobel Peace Prize winner Noel-Baker for the release of Jayaprakash Narayan.

Indira Gandhi revoked the emergency on 18 January 1977 and announced elections. The Janata Party, a vehicle for the broad spectrum of the opposition to Indira Gandhi, was formed under JP's guidance. The Janata Party was voted into power and became the first non-Congress party to form a government at the centre. On the call of Narayan, many youngsters joined the JP movement.

Death
Narayan died in Patna, Bihar, on 8 October 1979, three days before his 77th birthday, due to effects of diabetes and heart ailments. In March 1979, while he was in hospital, his death had been erroneously announced by the Indian prime minister, Morarji Desai, causing a grief wave of national mourning, including the suspension of parliament and regular radio broadcasting, and the closure of schools and shops. When he was told about the gaffe a few weeks later, he smiled.

Family
At the age of 17, Jayaprakash was married to Prabhavati Devi, daughter of lawyer and nationalist Brij Kishore Prasad in October 1919. Prabhavati was very independent and on Gandhi's invitation, went to stay at his ashram while Jayaprakash continued his studies. Prabhavati Devi died on 15 April 1973 after a long battle with cancer.

Awards

Bharat Ratna, 1999 (Posthumous) for Public Affairs: It is India's highest civilian award.
Rashtrabhushan Award of FIE Foundation, Ichalkaranji
Ramon Magsaysay Award, 1965 for Public Service.

Sites named after Jayaprakash Narayan 

 The Patna Airport
 On 1 August 2015, the Chhapra-Delhi-Chhapra Weekly Express was renamed as Loknayak Express in his honour.
 JP Setu the Digha-Sonpur Bridge, a rail-road bridge across river Ganga in Bihar
Jayaprakash Narayan Nagar (JP Nagar) a residential area in Bangalore.
Jayaprakash Nagar (JP Nagar) a residential area in Mysore.
Lok Nayak Hospital (hospital in New Delhi
Lok Nayak Jayaprakash Narayan National Institute of Criminology & Forensic Science (college in New Delhi)
JP University (University in Saran District)

Artistic depictions of JP
 Prakash Jha directed a 112-minute film "Loknayak", based on the life of Jaya Prakash Narayan (JP). Chetan Pandit played the role of JP in that film.
 Achyut Potdar played role of JP in ABP News show Pradhanmantri (TV Series) and Aaj Tak Aandolan.

References

Further reading and bibliography

Braja Kishore Prasad: The Hero of Many Battles by Sachidanand Sinha; National Book Trust, India, New Delhi; 2018;  
Red Fugitive: Jayaprakash Narayan by H L Singh Dewans Publications Lahore 1946
Life and Time of Jayaprakash Narayan by J S Bright Dewans Publications Lahore 1946
J.P: His Biography, Allan and Wendy Scarfe, Orient Longmans New Delhi 1975
Jayaprakash: Rebel Extraordinary, by Lakshmi Narayan Lal, Indian Book Company New Delhi 1975
Loknayak Jayaprakash Narayan, by Suresh Ram Macmillan Co. Delhi 1974
Loknayak Jayaprakash Narayan by Farooq Argali Janata Pocket Books Delhi 1977.
 Bimal Prasad (editor). 1980. A Revolutionary's Quest: Selected Writings of Jayaprakash Narayan. Oxford University Press, Delhi 
 Jai Prakash Narain, Jayaprakash Narayan, Essential Writings, 1929–1979: A Centenary Volume, 1902–2002, Konark Publishers (2002) 
 Dr. Kawaljeet, J.P.'s Total Revolution and Humanism (Patna: Buddhiwadi Foundation, 2002). 
 Dr. Ramendra (editor), Jayaprakash Vichar Sankalan [Hindi] (Patna: Rajendra Prakashan, 1986).
 Satyabrata Rai Chowdhuri, Leftism in India: 1917–1947 (London and New Delhi: Palgrave Macmillan, 2008).
 Radhakanta Barik, Politics of the JP Movement (Radiant Publications, Delhi, 1977)
 MG Devashayam, JP Movement Emergency and India's Second Freedom (Vitasta Publishing Pvt. Ltd., New Delhi, 2012). 
Why Socialism, 1936
War Circulars, 1–4 CSP, Lucknow
Inside Lahore Fort, Sahityalaya Patna 1947
Nation Building in India – JP Narayan
Three Basic Problems of India. From Socialism to Sarvodaya, Sarva Seva Sangh Prakashan, Varansi 1957
A Plea for Reconstruction of Indian Polity, Sarva Seva Sangh Prakashan, Varansi 1959
Swaraj for the People, Sarva Seva Sangh Prakashan, Varansi 1961
Sarvodaya Answer to Chinese Aggression, Sarvodaya Prachuralaya Tanjore 1963
Face to Face, Navchetna Prakashan, Varansi 1970
Prison Diary, Samajwadi Yuvjan Sabha Calcutta 1976 and Popular Prakashan, Bombay 1977.
Towards Struggle, edited by Yusuf Meherally, Padma Publications, Bombay 1946, 47
Socialism, Sarvodaya and Democracy, edited by Bimal Prasad, Asia Publishing House Bombay 1964
Communitarian Society and Panchayti Raj, edited by Brahmanand Navchetna Prakashan Varansi 1970
Nation-Building in India, edited by Brahmanand Navchetna Prakashan Varansi 1974
Towards Revolution, edited by Bhargava and Phadnis, Arnold-Heinemann New Delhi 1975
J.P's Jail Life (A Collection of Personal Letters) translated by G S Bhargava, Arnold-Heinemann New Delhi 1977
Towards Total Revolution, edited by Brahmanand Popular Prakashan Bombay 1978
J P:Profile of a non-conformist, Interviews by Bhola Chatterji, Minerva Associates, Calcutta, 1979
To All Fighters of Freedom II, A Revolutionary's Quest-selected writings of Jayprakash Narayan, edited by Bimal Prasad Oxford University Press New Delhi 1980
Concept of Total Revolution: An Introductory Essay(JP and social change) by Bimal Prasad

External links

 A plea for the reconstruction of Indian polity
 Total revolution
 On Hindu revivalism

1902 births
1979 deaths
People from Ballia district
Janata Party politicians
Indian National Congress politicians from Bihar
Bihari politicians
Indian independence activists from Bihar
Indian pacifists
Indian socialists
Politicians from Patna
The Emergency (India)
Social workers
Prisoners and detainees of British India
English-language writers from India
Indians imprisoned during the Emergency (India)
Indian social reformers
University of Iowa alumni
Ohio State University alumni
University of Wisconsin–Madison College of Letters and Science alumni
University of California, Berkeley alumni
Recipients of the Bharat Ratna
Ramon Magsaysay Award winners
Social workers from Bihar
Praja Socialist Party politicians
Academic staff of Bihar National College